Clapra is a genus of moths of the family Erebidae. The genus was erected by Heinrich Benno Möschler in 1880.

Species
Clapra asthenoides Möschler, 1880
Clapra atalanta Schaus, 1912
Clapra deucalion Schaus, 1914
Clapra ero Möschler, 1880
Clapra marginata Warren, 1889
Clapra oculata Schaus, 1914
Clapra punctulosa Walker, 1865
Clapra uzza Schaus, 1911

References

Calpinae